Highland Park is a suburban city located in the southeastern part of Lake County, Illinois, United States, about  north of downtown Chicago. Per the 2020 census, the population was 30,176. Highland Park is one of several municipalities located on the North Shore of the Chicago metropolitan area.

History
A traveler in the area in 1833 described visiting a village of bark-covered structures where he ate roasted corn with a chief named Nic-sa-mah at a site likely located south of present-day Clavey Road and east of the Edens Expressway.

In 1847, two German immigrants, John Hettinger and John Peterman founded a town along Lake Michigan, which they called St. John's. Soon, the town was abandoned, due to questions regarding ownership of the land. Three years later, another German Immigrant, Jacob Clinton Bloom, founded Port Clinton, which happened to be just south of St. John's. Port Clinton was described by Elijah Middlebrook Haines as "one of the most promising villages in the city". In 1854, a lighthouse was built in Port Clinton, thanks to funding by the US Congress and sponsorships from Illinois representatives. Despite having a functioning lighthouse with a keeper, a pier, sawmill, and a plank road, Port Clinton did not have a train station in 1855. In 1860, Port Clinton stopped growing as a town, and the lighthouse was shut down.

In 1867, ten men purchased Highland Park for $39,198.70. They were the original stockholders of the Highland Park Building Company. Following construction of the Chicago and Milwaukee Railroad, a depot was established at Highland Park and a plat, extending south to Central Avenue, was laid out in 1856. At that point, Highland Park was settled on mostly scattered farms and undeveloped forested land. Highland Park was established as a city on March 11, 1869, with a population of 500, and evolved from the two settlements of St. John and Port Clinton; St. John's Avenue and Port Clinton Square are named after the settlements. Highland Park was named from its parklike setting at a lofty elevation relative to the lake, and was given its name from Walter S. Gurnee. The town annexed the village of Ravinia in 1899. 

From its establishment in 1869 until November 1, 1900, Highland Park was a "dry" community, in which the sale of alcoholic drinks was prohibited.

In 2013, Highland Park passed an ordinance banning assault weapons within the city. In 2015, the U.S. Court of Appeals for the Seventh Circuit upheld the ban, and later that year, the U.S. Supreme Court allowed the ruling to stand.

On July 4, 2022, a mass shooting occurred at a Fourth of July parade in Highland Park, killing seven people and injuring dozens more. A suspect was apprehended hours later and charged with first-degree murder.

Overview

Highland Park has several attractions including a downtown shopping district and the Ravinia Festival. Ravinia Festival is an open-air pavilion seating 3,200, which hosts classical, pop, jazz and latin concerts in the summers. It has been the summer home of the Chicago Symphony Orchestra since 1936. Concert-goers can purchase seats in the covered pavilion or tickets to sit on the lawn. Many visitors arrive early and picnic on the lawn before and during concerts. The festival is located in Ravinia District, originally an artists' colony, which still retains much of its early character and architecture.

Highland Park has several landmark structures listed in the National Register of Historic Places, notably the Willits House by Frank Lloyd Wright. In addition to several houses designed by Wright, the National Register lists homes designed by prominent architects including John S. Van Bergen, Howard Van Doren Shaw, Robert E. Seyfarth, and David Adler. Landscape architect Jens Jensen lived in Highland Park and designed a number of projects in the community that are listed on the register.

There are three public beaches in Highland Park: Rosewood Beach, Moraine Beach (part of which is available for off-leash dogs), and Park Avenue Beach (which also has a boating facility). Highland Park is also home to the North Shore Yacht Club.

Geography

Demographics

2020 census

Note: the US Census treats Hispanic/Latino as an ethnic category. This table excludes Latinos from the racial categories and assigns them to a separate category. Hispanics/Latinos can be of any race.

2010 Census
As of the 2010 United States census, there were 29,763 people living in the city. The racial makeup of the city was 91.05% White, 1.84% Black or African American, 2.9% Asian, 0.18% Native American, 0.03% Pacific Islander, 2.51% of some other race and 1.48% of two or more races. 7.28% were Hispanic or Latino (of any race).

As of the census of 2000, there were 31,365 people, 11,521 households, and 8,917 families living in the city. The racial makeup of the city was 91.20% White, 1.78% African American, 0.08% Native American, 2.28% Asian, 0.01% Pacific Islander, 3.46% from other races, and 1.18% from two or more races. Hispanic or Latino of any race were 8.90% of the population.

There were 11,521 households, out of which 36.9% had children under the age of 18 living with them, 69.9% were married couples living together, 5.8% had a female householder with no husband present, and 22.6% were non-families. 19.5% of all households were made up of individuals, and 9.3% had someone living alone who was 65 years of age or older. The average household size was 2.71 and the average family size was 3.09.

In the city the population was spread out, with 27.0% under the age of 18, 4.6% from 18 to 24, 25.5% from 25 to 44, 27.8% from 45 to 64, and 15.1% who were 65 years of age or older. The median age was 41 years. For every 100 females, there were 95.9 males. For every 100 females age 18 and over, there were 92.5 males.

The median income for a household in the city was $100,967, and the median income for a family was $117,235. Males had a median income of $83,121 versus $41,175 for females. The per capita income for the city was $55,331. About 2.3% of families and 3.8% of the population were below the poverty line, including 3.9% of those under age 18 and 3.1% of those age 65 or over.

Government

The City of Highland Park is a council-manager government. The nonpartisan City Council consists of seven members, including an elected mayor and six council members, all elected at-large and serving staggered four-year terms. The current city council consists of:

Politics

Highland Park is considered a Democratic stronghold, giving Joe Biden more than 80% of its vote in the 2020 United States presidential election. Highland Park voters also tend to prefer Democrats in local races.

At the state level, Highland Park is a part of the 58th House District, represented by Bob Morgan (D-Highwood), and the 29th Senate District, represented by Julie Morrison (D-Deerfield). At the county level, the city is split between Districts 11 and 12, represented by former Highland Park City Councilman Paul Frank (D-Highland Park) and former Lake Forest Mayor Mike Rummel (R-Lake Forest), respectively.

Economy
The international headquarters of Solo Cup Company were previously located in Highland Park, before relocating to neighboring Lake Forest in 2009.

Transportation

The main highway in Highland Park is US-41, which connects Chicago to Milwaukee. Commuter rail is available at four Metra stations within city borders (Braeside, Ravinia Park, Ravinia, and Highland Park), as well as two in nearby Highwood (Highwood and Fort Sheridan) on the Union Pacific/North Line, which begins in Chicago and terminates in Kenosha, Wisconsin. Pace also offers several bus routes. Boat launch facilities are available along Lake Michigan.

Notable people

Highland Park is popular with professional athletes, as the Chicago Bears practice facility is in nearby Lake Forest. Several members of the championship Chicago Bulls of 1990s also live or lived in Highland Park including Michael Jordan, Scottie Pippen, Toni Kukoc, B. J. Armstrong, and GM Jerry Krause, thanks to its proximity to the team's practice facility in neighboring Deerfield.

Among famous Highland Parkers are singer, songwriter, and producer Richard Marx, who grew up in Highland Park, Smashing Pumpkins frontman Billy Corgan, who resides in Highland Park, national champion and Olympic medalist figure skater Jason Brown, who attended high school in Highland Park, and Golden Globe-winning actress Rachel Brosnahan from Amazon's The Marvelous Mrs. Maisel, who also grew up in Highland Park and attended Highland Park High School. Three-time Tony Award nominated actor Gary Sinise attended Highland Park High School and co-founded the Steppenwolf Theatre in neighboring Deerfield.

Grace Slick, lead singer of Jefferson Airplane, was born in Highland Park, on October 31, 1939.

In popular culture

Highland Park is the location of the main characters' former home in the CBS drama The Good Wife.

Highland Park was used for location shots for several movies written and directed by John Hughes in the 1980s including Ferris Bueller's Day Off, Weird Science, Sixteen Candles, Uncle Buck and Home Alone. Other popular films from the 1980s shot or partially set in Highland Park include Ordinary People, Risky Business, and Lucas. Since 2000, Highland Park movies have included Kicking & Screaming and Shattered Memories of Love. In the film Shattered Glass, Stephen Glass, portrayed by actor Hayden Christensen, makes repeated reference to his family's residence in Highland Park as an indication of the high expectations they have for his career.

"Highland Park has the feel of a gated community without the actual gates," writes Vanity Fair, and has a tradition of "very clever minds who left to strike gold in Hollywood." The creators of the Revenge of the Nerds, Beethoven, and other films grew up in Highland Park.

It also was the setting for the 2000/2001 Fox and PBS documentary show American High.

Education
North Shore School District 112 operates an early childhood center, eight elementary schools, and two middle schools.

Township High School District 113 operates Highland Park High School, as well as Deerfield High School in nearby Deerfield.

Sister cities
 Yeruham, Israel
 Modena, Italy
 Puerto Vallarta, Mexico

See also

 Danny Cunniff Park
 Highland Park High School
 Highland Park Public Library
 Highland Park Hospital
 Highland Park Presbyterian Church

References

External links

 City of Highland Park

 
1869 establishments in Illinois
Cities in Illinois
Cities in Lake County, Illinois
Illinois populated places on Lake Michigan
Populated places established in 1869